Eastbrook High School is a public school located outside Marion, Indiana. The school teaches students from Upland, Washington Township, Matthews, and Van Buren.

Description
Eastbrook High School is located at 560 S. 900 E. in Grant County, Indiana. It is the only high school in the Eastbrook Community School district.  The district includes the high school, a junior high (which is attached to the high school), and two elementary schools:  Eastbrook South Elementary (located in Upland, Indiana) and Eastbrook North Elementary (located in Van Buren, Indiana), . At the end of the 2009–2010 school year, Matthews Elementary, and Washington Elementary were closed and the remaining elementary schools were renamed from Upland Elementary and Van Buren Elementary to South and North, respectively.

Eastbrook is a member of the Central Indiana Conference (CIC).

Extracurriculars offered
Sports: Baseball (b), Cheerleading (g), Cross Country (b/g), Football (b), Golf (b/g), Softball (g), Track (b/g), Volleyball (g), Wrestling (b), Soccer (b/g).
Clubs and Others: Art Club, DECA, Drama Club, E Club (sports), E-Motion Dance Team, FCA, FFA, Honor Guard, Jazz/Pep Band, International Club, National Honor Society, Physics Club, Student Council, Quiz Bowl

See also
 List of high schools in Indiana

References

External links
 Eastbrook's Official Website
 Eastbrook Football Website
 School Snapshot

Public high schools in Indiana
Schools in Grant County, Indiana